Mārupe is a town in, and the administrative centre of, Mārupe Municipality, Latvia. The town is a suburb of the Latvian capital, Riga, but is a separate entity. Mārupe borders Zemgale Suburb of Riga to its east and northeast. The headquarters of the Latvian Bandy Federation is located in Mārupe. A small river Mārupīte flows through the town.

Riga International Airport is located just outside the town's boundary to the northwest.

According to the provisions of the 2021 Latvian administrative reform, Mārupe gained city rights (town status) on 1 July 2022.

Etymology 
The name Mārupe means "Mara's river" in Latvian and is derived from the name of the  river (upīte meaning a small river, or a stream), a left tributary of the Daugava. The river was the location of the historic Maras (Mary's) Mills, which initially belonged to the Cathedral chapter of the Riga Cathedral, the full name of which is The Cathedral Church of Saint Mary. The historic German name of the Mārupīte was Marienbach, or Mary's stream.

Economy 
The largest businesses registered in Mārupe in 2020 were: road transport company "Kreiss", auto parts saler "Inter Cars Latvija", computers saler "Also Latvia", electricals and computers saler "MoonCom".

Roads 
The main road through Mārupe is Riga-Jaunmārupe (P1132). Two big roads are the borders of town: Rīga-Eleja (A8) and Rīga-Ventspils (A10). The center of Riga is 9 km from Mārupe to north-east. Nearest railway passenger station is Tīraine 2 km to west from center of Mārupe. Trains through Tīraine to Riga and Jelgava go 26 times daily. Riga city buses also reach Mārupe.

References

Towns in Latvia
Mārupe Municipality